St. Barbe is an unincorporated settlement in Newfoundland and Labrador. It is located on the Great Northern Peninsula of the island of Newfoundland near Pigeon Cove (sometimes spelled Pidgeon Cove). St. Barbe and Pigeon Cove together have a population of 135 as of 2016.

St. Barbe is an important transportation site for the Great Northern Peninsula and the province of Newfoundland Labrador.

Geography

St. Barbe is a small community located on the northwestern part of the Great Northern Peninsula of the Canadian province of Newfoundland and Labrador. Located on Route 430, St. Barbe is also the eastern terminus of the ferry route that connects the island of Newfoundland to Labrador.   services the route across the Strait of Belle Isle and connects to the community of Blanc-Sablon, Quebec (near the Labrador border and Route 510), replacing  which serviced the route 1999-2019.

Community activities

St. Barbe is home to the region's arena. The community hosts a variety of events such as broomball, skating, and hockey, as well as the annual Straits Festival each summer.

Local fire service is based in Pigeon Cove. The community also has an RV Service Centre for travellers. Additional community, recreational, and business services are found in the communities in the Plum Point area and south in Hawkes Bay, Port au Choix, and Port Saunders.

In addition to the transportation connection to Labrador, the coastline and the Long Range Mountains offer incredible scenery to visiting tourists.

See also
 St. Barbe Bay
 Blanc-Sablon, Quebec
 Newfoundland and Labrador Route 430
 Newfoundland-Labrador fixed link
 Strait of Belle Isle

References

Populated places in Newfoundland and Labrador